Robert E. Holmes Jr. (b. 1956) is an American amateur astronomer and professional photographer. 

In 2002 Holmes founded Astronomical Research Institute (ARI), a non-profit organization offering students observation time from telescopes installed at the Astronomical Research Observatory originally in Charleston, Illinois and later at Westfield, Illinois.

The Minor Planet Center credits him with the discovery of thirteen asteroids made between 2004 and 2010, partly in collaboration with Harlan Devore and Tomáš Vorobjov.

Holmes discovered comet C/2008 N1 (Holmes).

The asteroid 5477 Holmes is named for him.

See also
List of minor planet discoverers

References

Further reading

External links
Astronomical Research Institute
Robert Holmes: Shoemaker NEO Grant recipient profile, The Planetary Society

1956 births
21st-century American astronomers
Discoverers of minor planets
Living people
Place of birth missing (living people)
 
Amateur astronomers